The Secret Garden is the 1987 Hallmark Hall of Fame made-for-television film adaptation of Frances Hodgson Burnett's 1911 novel The Secret Garden, aired on CBS November 30, 1987 and produced by Rosemont Productions Limited. The film stars Gennie James, Barret Oliver, Jadrien Steele, Billie Whitelaw, Michael Hordern, and Sir Derek Jacobi. It won a Primetime Emmy Award in 1988 for Outstanding Children's Program.

Plot
The story is told as a flashback of the adult Mary (Irina Brook) returning to Misselthwaite Manor after World War I, during which she worked as a nurse in a hospital. She looks for the key to the secret garden, but doesn't find it, so she sits down and remembers her childhood.

The main story begins in colonial India with the young, neglected, and selfish Mary Lennox (Gennie James) waking in the night to find her servants not answering and her parents having a late dinner party. The dinner guests discuss a cholera epidemic that is infesting the region, but Mary's vain shallow mother cares only about attending another party. Only moments later, Colonel Lennox collapses. The following morning, Mary wakes to find her parents dying and all their servants either dead or fled. She is discovered by English officers and is soon sent to live with a friend of the family named Mr. Craven (Derek Jacobi), even though the two of them have never before met.

Mary is sent to Misselthwaite Manor, an isolated home on the moors of Yorkshire. She is shocked and disappointed when the servants do not defer to her as they did in India. While adjusting to life in England, Mary meets the maid Martha (Cassie Stuart) who tells her the story of a secret walled garden that was locked up, with the key thrown away, after the late Mrs. Craven died there. Mary distracts herself from her loneliness and boredom by searching for the door to this garden. Eventually, she finds both door and key, only to learn that the garden has fallen to ruin. With the help of Martha's brother Dickon (Barret Oliver), Mary works to revive the garden.

Meanwhile, inside Misselthwaite Manor, Mary frequently wakes in the night to the ghostly sounds of sobbing. The servants insist that the sound is the wind, but one night Mary goes exploring and discovers Mr. Craven's bed-bound son Colin (Jadrien Steele), who weeps incessantly because he is convinced he is going to die. Everyone in the house hates him and hopes he will finally die because of his bad temper. The two gradually become friends as Mary tells him about his mother's garden and how she and Dickon have been restoring it. At last Colin is curious enough that he demands to see this garden.

With Dickon's help, Mary take Colin in his wheelchair to visit the garden in secret. Soon Colin declares that the garden must be magic, which inspires him to take his first steps unassisted.  The house gardener Ben Weatherstaff (Michael Hordern), who has been spying on the children, witnesses this and is amazed. Ben offers to help revive the garden as well, and Colin tries to learn to stand and walk by himself.

Far away in London, Mr. Craven receives a letter from Dickon's mother Susan insisting he return to Misselthwaite Manor at once. Mr Craven arrives to discover the secret garden in full bloom, with the children gathered there. Colin rises and walks to his father for the first time, announcing that he is well now and will live forever.

When the adult Mary finishes remembering her childhood, Ben Weatherstaff greets her and gives her the key to the secret garden. They discuss what happened to Dickon, who died in the war, at the Forest of Argonne. Then the adult Colin (Colin Firth) enters the garden, having been wounded and released from the hospital. He says he has asked Mary to marry him before, but she never answered. She says she has been waiting for him to ask her in their garden. Colin proposes again, and Mary accepts.

The film actually caused confusion to some, as at the end of the movie, adult Colin proposes to Mary and the two share a kiss. In the novel, the two are said to be cousins, and Archibald Craven is Mary’s uncle, which made viewers question the morality of the kiss. In this version, they are not cousins, and are very explicitly written as such.

Cast
 Gennie James as Mary Lennox
 Irina Brook as Adult Mary Lennox
 Barret Oliver as Dickon Sowerby
 Jadrien Steele as Colin Craven
 Colin Firth as Adult Colin Craven
 Billie Whitelaw as Mrs. Medlock
 Cassie Stuart as Martha Sowerby
 Michael Hordern as Ben Weatherstaff
 Derek Jacobi as Archibald Craven
 Lucy Gutteridge as Mrs. Lennox
 Julian Glover as Colonel McGraw
 Margaret Whiting as Nurse Boggs
 Philip Locke as Pitcher
 David Waller as Dr. Craven
 Pat Heywood as Mrs. Sowerby
 Carmel McSharry as Mrs. Gordy
 Tony Selby as Sergeant Barney
 Alison Doody as Lilias
 Edward Tudor-Pole as John
 Stephen Dillane as Captain Lennox
 Dominic Hawksley as Soldier

Production

Filming
Highclere Castle was used for interior and exterior settings of Misselthwaite Manor.

Soundtrack
The film uses Chopin's Nocturne no. 19 as its main theme.

Sequel

References

External links
 

Hallmark Hall of Fame episodes
1987 television films
1987 films
Films based on The Secret Garden
Films scored by John Cameron
1980s children's fantasy films